Chopsticks may refer to:

Chopsticks
"Chopstix" (song), by Schoolboy Q and Travis Scott, 2019